In the Doghouse or In the Dog House may refer to:

 In the Doghouse (film), a 1962 British comedy
 "In the Doghouse" (short story), by Orson Scott Card
 In the Dog House, American title of the Canadian reality TV show At the End of My Leash

See also
 In a Doghouse, a 1998 Throwing Muses compilation album